The Independent Ambulance Association or IAA is the non-profit body representing ambulance services regulated by the Care Quality Commission in England, but not part of the statutory National Health Service provision, who are represented by the Association of Ambulance Chief Executives.

Objectives
The organisation exists to act as a single voice on policy which affects independent operators of ambulance services, including working on areas such as procurement, training and consistency between services.

History
The organisation formally launched in January 2012, with directors from leading independent ambulance providers, and an independent non-executive director.

References

External links
 Official website

 
Medical and health organisations based in London
Health in London